Qurumba (also, Quruba) is a village and municipality in the Lankaran Rayon of Azerbaijan. It has a population of 837.

References

Populated places in Lankaran District